The Warsaw Insurgents Cemetery is located at 174/176 Wolska Street in the Wola district of Warsaw. It was established in 1945 and occupies .

It is the largest burial site of victims of the Warsaw Uprising, which broke out on 1 August 1944 and lasted until 2 October 1944. Approximately 104,000 people (mainly persons unknown) are buried in the cemetery, mostly in collective graves. Its centrepiece is the monument to The Fallen Unconquerable, created by Professor Kazimierz Zemła, under which the ashes of 50,000 victims of the uprising are buried. The monument was unveiled in 1973.

Approximately 10,000 Polish resistance fighters and 200,000 civilians were killed during the 63 days of the Warsaw Uprising. Thousands of victims were buried in makeshift graves all over Warsaw and thousands more were never identified or given any sort of burial. The huge task of exhuming and re-burying the dead began in 1945. The first transfers of human remains to the newly created Warsaw Insurgents Cemetery began in November of that year and the remains of victims from all over the capital continued to be buried there for the next two years.

Other victims of World War II are also buried within the cemetery, including defenders of Warsaw during its siege by the Germans in September 1939 and Warsaw inhabitants murdered during the German occupation. Most of these are also persons unknown. Warsaw Insurgents Cemetery is adjacent to the Wola Cemetery.

Selected gallery

See also
 Warsaw Uprising
 Wola massacre
 Ochota massacre
 Planned destruction of Warsaw
 German occupation of Poland
 Polish resistance movement in World War II
 Home Army

References 

 Comprehensive description at the Cmentarium website

Cemeteries in Warsaw
Warsaw Uprising
World War II monuments and memorials in Poland
Monuments and memorials in Warsaw
1945 establishments in Poland